Kansallis-Osake-Pankki (KOP) was a Finnish commercial bank operating from 1889 to 1995. It was created by the fennoman movement as a Finnish language alternative to the largely Swedish language bank, Suomen Yhdyspankki (Swedish: Föreningsbanken i Finland). The two banks were merged in 1995 to form the Merita Bank. Merita Bank was later merged with Swedish Nordbanken to form Nordea.

Directors 
 Otto Hjelt (1889–1892)
 Fredrik Nybom (1892–1914)
 J.K. Paasikivi (1914–1934)
 Mauri Honkajuuri (1934–1948)
 Matti Virkkunen (1948–1975)
 Veikko Makkonen (1975–1983)
 Jaakko Lassila (1983–1991)
 Pertti Voutilainen (1991–1995)

See also

External links 
 Panu Moilanen: Kämpin peilisalista Savoyn juhlakerrokseen. 105 vuotta Kansallis-Osake-Pankkia

Banks of Finland
Banks established in 1889
1889 establishments in the Russian Empire
Companies formerly listed on Nasdaq Helsinki